Ásta Halldórsdóttir (born 27 November 1970) is an Icelandic alpine skier. She competed at the 1992 Winter Olympics and the 1994 Winter Olympics. In both Albertville and Lillehammer she was the ensign of the Icelandic team.

References

External links
 

1970 births
Living people
Asta Halldorsdottir
Asta Halldorsdottir
Alpine skiers at the 1992 Winter Olympics
Alpine skiers at the 1994 Winter Olympics
Asta Halldorsdottir
20th-century Icelandic women